B-FAST (Belgian First Aid and Support Team, sometimes styled B-Fast) is the rapid intervention structure of the Belgian government. It provides emergency aid during disasters abroad, at the request of the foreign government, providing an armed conflict is absent and when the foreign country is no longer capable itself to organise an adequate aid. 

It was founded by the Belgian government after the August 1999 Turkish earthquakes. B-Fast is composed of doctors, nurses, firefighters, members of the Belgian Civil Protection, dog handlers, mountaineering teams, military personnel and logistic helpers.

References

External links
B-FAST at diplomatie.be
First Aid Kits - Rusun Medical

Medical and health organisations based in Belgium
Humanitarian aid organizations
First aid organizations